"Loving Every Minute" is a song written by Michael White, Tom Shapiro and Monty Criswell, and recorded by American country music artist Mark Wills.  It was released in April 2001 as the first single and title track from the album Loving Every Minute.  The song reached number 18 on the Billboard Hot Country Singles & Tracks chart.

Music video
The music video was directed by Trey Fanjoy and premiered in May 2001.

Chart performance 
"Loving Every Minute" debuted at number 58 on the U.S. Billboard Hot Country Singles & Tracks for the week of April 28, 2001.

References 

2001 singles
2001 songs
Mark Wills songs
Songs written by Tom Shapiro
Songs written by Michael White (singer)
Song recordings produced by Carson Chamberlain
Mercury Records singles
Songs written by Monty Criswell